Below is a bibliography of published works written by Dutch-born Catholic priest Henri Nouwen. The works are listed under each category by year of publication. This includes 42 books, four of which were published posthumously, along with 51 articles and 4 chapters which are lists in process. Also listed below are 31 of the forewords, introductions, and afterwords which he wrote for others' works. Finally, the list of 32 readers and compilations continues to grow as material from his work is incorporated into new publications.

Books by Nouwen

Posthumous releases

Chapters

Articles

Forewords, introductions and afterwords

Readers and compilations

References

Bibliographies by writer
Christian bibliographies